Christianity in Bihar, a state of India, is a minority religion, being practised by less than 0.5% of the population. Most people, about 83%, in Bihar are Hindus. Padri Ki Haveli is a Roman Catholic church in Bihar, which exists for centuries. The Diocese of Patna of the Church of North India and Emmanuel Christian Fellowship Centre (ECFC) are present in Bihar and the Pentecostal Holiness Church are present in Bihar as well as the Roman Catholic Archdiocese of Patna. The archdiocese has suffragan dioceses:the Roman Catholic Diocese of Bettiah, the Roman Catholic Diocese of Bhagalpur, the Roman Catholic Diocese of Buxar, the Roman Catholic Diocese of Muzaffarpur and the Roman Catholic Diocese of Purnea, all of whom have their seat in Bihar. Bihar has numerous house churches and a Christ Church Diocesan School exists in Patna.
Indian Pentecostal church of God Northern Region is the leading and oldest Pentecostal church in Bihar. Oldest Pentecostal Fellowship started in Rajendra Nagar, Patna. And Bihar has Christian Revival Church.

History 
During the Bettiah Raj of Bihar, the ethnoreligious community of Bettiah Christians was established in India in the 17th century by Christian missionaries belonging to the Order of Friars Minor Capuchin, a Roman Catholic religious order. It is one of the northern Indian subcontinent's oldest Christian communities that was founded after Raja Dhurup Singh requested Joseph Mary Bernini to heal his ill wife and was successful in doing so. The Bettiah Christian Mission flourished under the patronage of the royal court of the Bettiah Rajas, growing in number.

From the 17th century onwards, Catholic Christian missionaries of the Jesuit and Capuchin religious orders "established hospices at Kathmandu, Patan and Bhatgoan, the capitals of the three Malla Kings of Nepal who had permitted them to preach Christianity." An indigenous Newar Christian community thus became established. When the Mallas were overthrown by the Gurkhas, the Newar Christians took refuge in India, settling first in the city of Bettiah and then later moving eleven kilometres north to Chuhari, where they reside to this day.

List of denominations
Bihar Mennonite Mandli
Emmanuel Christian Fellowship Centre
Bethel Pentecostal Church
Gospel Echoing Missionary Society
Indian Pentecostal church of God Northern Region IPCNR leading and oldest Pentecostal church in Bihar.
Christian Revival Church

Demography 
Christianity is 3rd largest religion of Bihar, being practiced by 0.12% of the total state population. The Jain population in Bihar is 53,137 as of 2011 census report. As per 2001 census, only 53,137 Christian  were living in Bihar.

References

 
Religion in Bihar